The netball competitions at the 2017 Southeast Asian Games in Kuala Lumpur were held from 14 to 20 August at Juara Stadium in Bukit Kiara.

Competition schedule
The following was the competition schedule for the netball competitions:

Squads

Results
All times are Malaysia Standard Time (UTC+08:00)

Preliminary round

Final round

Semi-finals

Gold medal match

Medal summary

Medalists

References

External links
  

Netball
2017 in netball
2017
International netball competitions hosted by Malaysia